The Church of Crete is an Eastern Orthodox church, comprising the island of Crete in Greece. The Church of Crete is semi-autonomous (self-governing) under the jurisdiction of the Ecumenical Patriarchate of Constantinople.The current archbishop of Crete is Eugenios II.

Overview
The Church of Crete has been self-governing since late Ottoman times. The charter of the church was recognized by law (Law 4149/1961) by the Greek state in 1961, some 50 years after the island's incorporation into Greece. In 1962, the Ecumenical Patriarchate elevated the island's bishoprics to metropolises, and in 1967, the Metropolitan of Crete was promoted to Archbishop. The patriarchate nominates the island's presiding bishop from a list of three Cretan bishops prepared by the Greek Ministry of National Education and Religious Affairs, but the church's affairs, including the nomination of the other bishops, are otherwise handled by the Holy Provincial Synod of Crete. The link with the Patriarchate ensures less opposition to ecumenism than generally expressed in the mainland Church of Greece.

The Church of Crete is composed of:
 the Archbishopric of Crete, based at Heraklion
 the Metropolis of Gortyn and Arkadia, based at Moires
 the Metropolis of Rethymno and Mylopotamos, based at Rethymno
 the Metropolis of Kydonia  and Apokoronas, based at Chania
 the Metropolis of Lampi, Syvritos and Sfakia, based at Spili
 the Metropolis of Hierapytna and Siteia, based at Ierapetra
 the Metropolis of Petra and Hersonissos, based at Neapoli
 the Metropolis of Kissamos and Selino, based at Kastelli Kissamou
 the Metropolis of Arkalochori, Kastelli and Viannos, based at Arkalochori.

See also
 List of Archbishops of Crete

References

Bibliography

External links
Official website Holy Eparchial Synod of the Church of Crete 
Official website Holy Archdiocese of Crete 

 
Crete
Greek Orthodoxy in Greece